Salesi Tuivuna Mauri Rayasi (born 25 September 1996 in Wellington) is a New Zealand rugby union player who plays for the  in Super Rugby. His playing position is wing. He signed for the Hurricanes squad in 2019. He also plays for the New Zealand national rugby sevens team.

Reference list

External links
itsrugby.co.uk profile

1996 births
New Zealand rugby union players
Living people
Rugby union wings
People educated at St. Patrick's College, Silverstream
Rugby union players from Wellington City
Wellington rugby union players
Auckland rugby union players
Hurricanes (rugby union) players
Moana Pasifika players